is a Japanese voice actress who is affiliated with Arts Vision.

Filmography

Television animation
1980s
Captain Tsubasa (1983) – Sanae Nakazawa
Cat's Eye (1983) – Ai Kisugi
Nine (1983) – Yukimi Yasuda
Super Dimension Century Orguss (1983) – Lieea
Urusei Yatsura (1984) – Ginger
Mobile Suit Zeta Gundam (1985) – Shinta
Princess Sara (1985) – Peter
Ginga: Nagareboshi Gin (1986) – Daisuke
High School! Kimengumi (1986) – Hisako Otonari
Maison Ikkoku (1986) – Kentarō Ichinose
Mobile Suit Gundam ZZ (1986) – Shinta
Pastel Yumi, the Magic Idol (1986) – Kenta Misawa
City Hunter (1987) – Horikoshi (16th and 39th episode)
Norakuro-kun (1987) - Norakuro
Kimagure Orange Road (1987) – Kazuya Kasuga
Anpanman (1988) – Tendonman, Chibizou-kun
Jungle Emperor (1989) – Meyer
Miracle Giants Dome-kun (1989) – Dome Shinjo
1990s
Tensai Bakabon (1990) – Hajime
Moomin (1990) – Teety-Woo
Anime Himitsu no Hanazono (1991) – Martha Phoebe Sowerby
Muka Muka Paradise (1993) – Muka Muka
Fushigi Yûgi (1995) – Nuriko, Houki
Juuni Senshi Bakuretsu Eto Ranger (1995) – Bakumaru
Baby and Me (1996) – Minoru Enoki
Hell Teacher Nūbē (1996) – Yukibe
Pretty Soldier Sailor Moon Sailor Stars (1996) – Yaten Kou/Sailor Star Healer
Chūka Ichiban! (1997) – Shirō
Anime Ganbare Goemon (1997) – Sasuke
Pocket Monsters (1997) – Obaba
Cyborg Kuro-chan (1999) – Kuro, Shin Bousou Kuro
Digimon Adventure (1999) – Agumon, Natsuko Takaishi
2000s
Digimon Adventure 02 (2000) – Agumon, Natsuko Takaishi
Crush Gear Turbo (2001) – Jin Kyōsuke
Fighting Foodons (2001) – Zen Makunouchi
Pecola (2001) – Tsunekichi
Shaman King (2001) – Aren
Origami Warriors (2003) – Arata Okimura
Ashita no Nadja (2003) – Jean
Machine Robo Rescue (2003) – Ricky
Mirmo! (2003) – Chikku
Digital Monster X-Evolution (2005) – WarGreymon X
Demashita! Powerpuff Girls Z (2006) – Puyo
Saru Get You -On Air- (2006) – Specter, Kūta, reporter
Detective Conan (2007) – Takumi Hashiratani (episode 462)
Darker than Black (2007) – Misuzu Ōyama
2010s
Digimon Xros Wars (2010) – Shoutmon, Agumon
HeartCatch PreCure! (2010) – Kaoruko Hanasaki/Cure Flower
One Piece (2011) – Stelly
JoJo's Bizarre Adventure: Diamond Is Unbreakable (2016) — Ken Oyanagi
Digimon Universe: Appli Monsters (2017) – Agumon
Digimon Adventure (2020) - Agumon

ONA
Lupin the 3rd vs. Cat's Eye (2023) – Ai Kisugi

OVA
Leda: The Fantastic Adventure of Yohko (1985) – Yoni
Here is Greenwood (1991) – Shun Kisaragi
Slow Step (1991) – Chika Tanaka
Fushigi Yûgi OVA 1 (1996–97) – Nuriko
Fushigi Yûgi OVA 2 (1997–98) – Nuriko, Houki
Fushigi Yûgi Eikoden (2001–02) – Nuriko, Houki

Theatrical animation
Nausicaä of the Valley of the Wind (1984) – Boy
Night on the Galactic Railroad (1985) – Campanella
My Neighbor Totoro (1988) – Mei Kusakabe
Sailor Moon Supers: The Movie (1995) – Peruru
Pretty Cure All Stars New Stage 2: Friends of the Heart (2013) - Kage
Doraemon: New Nobita's Great Demon—Peko and the Exploration Party of Five (2014) – Chippo
Digimon Adventure tri. (2015-2018) – Agumon, Greymon, MetalGreymon, WarGreymon, Koromon
One Piece Film: Gold (2016)
City Hunter the Movie: Shinjuku Private Eyes (2019) – Ai Kisugi
Digimon Adventure: Last Evolution Kizuna (2020) - Agumon

Video games
Arc the Lad (1995) (Poco)
Digimon Adventure (video game) (2013) (Agumon, Greymon, MetalGreymon, WarGreymon)
Grandia (1997) (Milda)
Ape Escape series (1999) (Specter)
Rockman 8 (1996) (Clownman, Aquaman)
Shenmue (1999) (Keika)
Super Robot Wars series (????–????) (Kappei Jin, Lieea)
Kingdom Hearts: Birth by Sleep (2010) (Huey, Dewey, and Louie)
Digimon Survive (2022) (Agumon)

Tokusatsu
Morimori Bokkun (1986) (Bokkun)
Chikyu Sentai Fiveman (1990) (Sairagin (ep. 7, 19))
Kyōryū Sentai Zyuranger Dino Video (1993) (Dino-kun)
Ultraman Zearth (1996) (Digital Kanegon)
Engine Sentai Go-Onger (2008) (Wameikle (Chibi) (ep. 41))

Dubbing

Live-action
Bad Santa – Thurman Merman (Brett Kelly)
Baggage Claim – Gail Best (Jill Scott)
The Crow – Sarah (Rochelle Davis)
Fuller House – D.J. Tanner (Candace Cameron Bure)
The Goonies (1988 TBS edition) – Lawrence "Chunk" Cohen (Jeff Cohen)
The Man Who Knew Too Little – Lori (Joanne Whalley)
Near Dark (1990 TV Tokyo edition) – Homer (Joshua John Miller)

Animation
Happy Feet Two – Atticus
¡Mucha Lucha! – The Flea

References

External links
Official agency profile 

1959 births
Living people
Voice actresses from Tokyo
Japanese video game actresses
Japanese voice actresses
20th-century Japanese actresses
21st-century Japanese actresses
Arts Vision voice actors